Hae-joo is a Korean unisex given name.  

Fictional characters with this name include:
Hae-joo Chang, in David Mitchell's 2004 novel Cloud Atlas and its 2012 film adaptation Cloud Atlas
Chun Hae-joo, in 2012 South Korean television series May Queen

See also
List of Korean given names

Korean unisex given names